The electoral district of Box Hill is an electoral district of the Victorian Legislative Assembly, covering an area of  in eastern Melbourne. It contains the suburbs of Box Hill, Box Hill North, Box Hill South, Mont Albert, Mont Albert North, most of Blackburn, Blackburn North, and Blackburn South, and parts of Balwyn North, Burwood, Burwood East, and Surrey Hills.

It lies within the Eastern Metropolitan Region in the upper house, the Legislative Council.

Electoral boundary changes
The electoral district of Doncaster was split off from Box Hill and created in 1976 due to population growth.

A redistribution of electorate boundaries in 1991 abolished the Balwyn electorate and incorporated most of it into Box Hill. A large part of the Box Hill electorate (with 17,290 electors) was also transferred to Mitcham. These changes took effect at the 1992 Victorian state election.

For the 2014 election, the boundaries of Box Hill moved eastwards. Balwyn North was moved to the electorate of Kew and part of Surrey Hills were moved to Burwood and Hawthorn. The former electorate of Mitcham was abolished so Blackburn, Nunawading and part of Forest Hill were moved into Box Hill. The Liberal margin in Box Hill was estimated to fall from 13.8 percentage points to an estimated 9.4.

Members for Box Hill

Election results

References

External links
 Electorate profile: Box Hill District, Victorian Electoral Commission

Electoral districts of Victoria (Australia)
1945 establishments in Australia
City of Whitehorse
Electoral districts and divisions of Greater Melbourne